The Church of Bangladesh is a united Protestant church formed by the union of various Protestant churches in Bangladesh, principally the Anglican and Presbyterian denominations. The Church of Bangladesh is a member of the Anglican Communion and World Communion of Reformed Churches.

History
The Church of Bangladesh came into being as the outcome of the separation of East Bengal province from Pakistan. This started as a movement which focused on language and took shape through the liberation war in 1971, which created an independent Bangladesh. The Synod of the Church of Pakistan on 30 April 1974 declared and endorsed a free and independent status for the Church of Bangladesh. The Church of Bangladesh brings together the Anglican and English Presbyterian Churches.

Following the creation of the Church of Bangladesh, efforts were made to increase local leadership. B. D. Mondal was consecrated as the first national bishop of Dhaka Diocese in 1975. He tried to follow the path of Bishop Blair, by encouraging the active participation of lay leaders from all sections of the church congregations. After the creation of the synod, B. D. Mondal became the first moderator of the Church of Bangladesh and Michael S. Baroi the deputy moderator. At the time of B. D. Mondal's retirement, a new bishop was elected, and Paul Sarker, in January 2003, became the third national bishop of the Church of Bangladesh. Although the title 'archbishop' is not employed in this province, since the acknowledgement of the Bishop of Dhaka as a Primate within the Anglican Communion, he has been entitled to the usual archiepiscopal prefix "the Most Reverend". The current Primate is Samuel Mankhin, enthroned on 5 December 2018.

Dioceses
There are three dioceses of the Church of Bangladesh:

Diocese of Dhaka
Erected in 1956 by dividing the Diocese of Calcutta, the diocese (originally called "East Bengal") covered all East Pakistan. It was in the Church of India, Pakistan, Burma and Ceylon until the 1970 union of the Church of Pakistan. It became the sole diocese of the Church of Bangladesh upon the church's 30 April 1974 independence. Since it was split to create Kushtia diocese, the Moderator of the Synod has usually also been Bishop in Dhaka.
1956–1975: James D. Blair (assistant bishop of Calcutta (for East Bengal), 1951–1956)
1975–2003: B. D. Mondal (consecrated 16 February 1975, Oxford Mission Church)
2003–2009: Michael S. Baroi (installed 24 January 2003)
200918 February 2019 (ret.): Paul Shishir Sarker (Moderator 200919 November 2018)
2019–present: Samuel Sunil Mankhin

Diocese of Kushtia
Founded from Dhaka diocese in 1990; the Bishop in Kushtia was ex officio deputy moderator until 2018, when the new bishop in Barisal became deputy moderator (as the second mosty senior bishop by consecration).
Michael S. Baroi (consecrated 30 November 1990, St Peter's Ratanpur)
Paul Shishir Sarkar (consecrated 5 January 2003, Oxford Mission Church)
?–2019: Samuel Sunil Mankhin (consecrated 8 November 2009, St Mary's Haluaghat; Moderator since 19 November 2018)
2019–present: Hemen Halder (consecrated 27 January 2019)

Diocese of Barisal
Formed in 2017 from Dhaka diocese.
2017–present: Shourabh Pholia (elected 24 February; consecrated 30 April, at Christ the King Khalishpur; installed 18 June; Deputy Moderator since 19 November 2018)

Anglican realignment
The Church of Bangladesh is a member of the Global South. Moderator Paul Sarker attended an Anglican Church in North America meeting on 13–15 May 2017, at Holy Cross Cathedral, in Loganville, Georgia. He and Archbishop Foley Beach, of the ACNA, signed "A Joint Statement on Communion from the Primate of Bangladesh and the Primate of the Anglican Church", to affirm and celebrate the communion between both churches. It was also discussed how both provinces could work together with mission partnerships. The Church of Bangladesh was the first united province of the Anglican Communion to declare full communion with the ACNA.

The Church of Bangladesh wasn't represented at GAFCON III, on 17–22 June 2018, because it took place in Jerusalem, but Samuel Mankhin attended G19, the additional conference that took place in Dubai, on 25 February – 1 March 2019.

References

External links
Church of Bangladesh Official Website

 
Anglican Communion church bodies
Anglican realignment denominations
Christian organizations established in 1974
Bangladesh
Bangladesh
Christian denominations established in the 20th century
Members of the World Communion of Reformed Churches